Frederick Karl may refer to:

Frederick R. Karl (1927–2004), literary biographer
Frederick B. Karl (1924–2013), American politician
Prince Friedrich Karl of Prussia (1828–1885), Prussian prince and military commander during the wars of German unification
Prince Friedrich Karl of Prussia (1893–1917), German prince and competitive horse rider in the 1912 Olympics

See also
Frederick Carl (disambiguation)
Friedrich Carl (disambiguation)